Hammonton Municipal Airport  is a public-use airport located  northeast of the central business district of the town of Hammonton in Atlantic County, New Jersey, United States. The airport is publicly owned.

Facilities and aircraft 
It has one runway designated 03/21 with an asphalt surface measuring 3,602 by 50 feet (1,098 x 15 m).

For the 12-month period ending September 6, 2008, the airport had 15,900 aircraft operations, an average of 44 per day: 100% general aviation. At that time there were 23 aircraft based at this airport: 91% single-engine, 4% multi-engine and 4% helicopters.

References

External links

Airports in New Jersey
Transportation buildings and structures in Atlantic County, New Jersey
Hammonton, New Jersey